The Ketengban or also known as Kupel is an ethnic group who inhabit mountainous areas in Pegunungan Bintang Regency , Highland Papua. This ethnic group is one of the seven major ethnic groups in the Pegunungan Bintang Regency.

Language

Ketengban, also known as Kupel, is a Papuan languages spoken in the Pegunungan Bintang Regency, Highland Papua.

The dialects of this language are Okbab (Okbap), Bime, Onya (Una), Omban (kamume), and Sirkai.

See also

Indigenous people of New Guinea

References

Ethnic groups in Indonesia